The xinit program allows a user to manually start an X display server. The startx script is a front-end for xinit.

By default, xinit and startx start an X display server pointing to a display device that is enumerated as :0 and then start an xterm on it. When the xterm terminates, xinit and startx kill the X display server. In general, xinit and startx can start an arbitrary server and run an arbitrary script. Typically, this script runs a number of programs and a window manager.

Two alternative methods for starting an X display server are by using a display manager and by starting the X server and then manually starting one or more clients. On desktop Linux systems, a display manager is the most commonly used method.

References 
 Valerie Quercia + Tim O'Reilly, X Window System User's Guide, O'Reilly & Associates, Inc., USA, 1993
 Linda Mui + Eric Pearce, X Window System Administrator's Guide, O'Reilly & Associates, Inc., USA, 1993

External links 
 xinit manual page
 startx manual page

X Window System